Lacrosse Hall of Fame may refer to: 

Canadian Lacrosse Hall of Fame
National Lacrosse League Hall of Fame
National Lacrosse Hall of Fame and Museum